The Violin Sonata No. 2 in A major, Op. 100 ("Thun" or "Meistersinger"), by Johannes Brahms was written while spending the summer of 1886 in Thun in the Bernese Oberland, Switzerland.

It was a very fertile and refreshing time for Brahms. His friend, the Swiss pastor and poet  (1842–1911), lived in Berne and they visited each other.  He was also visited by the poet Klaus Groth and the young German contralto Hermine Spies.  Both Groth and Brahms were somewhat enamoured of Spies. He found himself so invigorated by the genial atmosphere and surroundings that he said the area was "so full of melodies that one has to be careful not to step on any". In a short space of time, he produced, in addition to this violin sonata, the Cello Sonata No. 2 in F major, Op. 99, the Piano Trio No. 3 in C minor, Op. 101, and various songs.

The second Violin Sonata is the shortest and is considered the most lyrical of Brahms's three violin sonatas. It is also considered the most difficult of the three to bring off successfully, and to exhibit its balance of lyricism and virtuosity. It maintains a radiant, happy mood throughout.

Movements

The sonata consists of three movements, with the middle movement doing service as both a slow movement and a scherzo:

Commentary
By giving the work the formal title of "Sonata for Piano and Violin", rather than the more usual "Sonata for Violin and Piano", Brahms indicated the piano part was just as important as the violin part.  In keeping with this, he allowed the piano to announce the opening theme.  The first three notes of the first movement are very similar in both melody and harmony to the first three notes of "Walther's Prize Song" (Morgendlich leuchtend im rosigen Schein) from Richard Wagner's opera Die Meistersinger von Nürnberg.  Although they were musical rivals, Brahms was a great admirer of Wagner's music, but whether this was a deliberate quotation on Brahms's part is open to speculation. Nevertheless, the sonata has often been subtitled the "Meistersinger" Sonata.  It is also sometimes called the "Thun" Sonata from the place of its creation.

Motifs from three of the songs Brahms wrote that summer with Hermine Spies's voice in mind appear fleetingly in the sonata: "Wie Melodien zieht es mir leise durch den Sinn", Op. 105/1 ("Like melodies it steals softly through my mind"; words by Klaus Groth) makes an appearance in the second subject of the first movement.  "Immer leiser wird mein Schlummer", Op. 105/2 ("Ever gentle is my slumber"; words by Hermann Lingg) and "Auf dem Kirchhofe", Op. 105/4 (words by Detlev von Liliencron) are quoted in the final movement.  The song "Komm bald", Op. 97/5 ("Come soon"; words by Groth) is also said have provided thematic inspiration for the sonata.

An outstanding quotation of Brahms' own music can also be found at bar 89 in the last movement. Lied Meine liebe ist grün (Op. 63 no 5, poem by Felix Schumann, son of Robert and Clara, died in 1879) provides the dramatic portion of its melody corresponding to die glänzt wohl herab auf den Fliederbusch lyrics ('which gleams down on the lilac bush').

For French musicologist Georges Kan, this is the location of the little phrase in Vinteuil Sonata which Swann listens to in
'In Search of Lost Time' by Marcel Proust.

The Violin Sonata No. 2 was premiered in Vienna on 2 December 1886 by the violinist Joseph Hellmesberger and Brahms himself at the piano.

Brahms's friend the poet Josef Widmann later wrote a poem to be accompanied by the sonata.

Recordings

References

External links
 

Chamber music by Johannes Brahms
Brahms, Violin Sonata No. 2
1886 compositions
Compositions in A major